The 2015 season is Haugesund's sixth season in the Tippeligaen following their promotion in 2009 and their 7th season with Jostein Grindhaug as manager.

Squad

Out on loan

Transfers

Winter

In:

Out:

Summer

In:

Out:

Competitions

Tippeligaen

Results summary

Results by round

Results

Table

Norwegian Cup

Squad statistics

Appearances and goals

|-
|colspan="14"|Players away from Haugesund on loan:

|-
|colspan="14"|Players who appeared for Haugesund no longer at the club:

|}

Goal scorers

Disciplinary record

References

FK Haugesund seasons
Haugesund